This is a complete list of all aerial bombs  used by the Imperial Japanese Navy during the Second World War.

Types

The Japanese navy produced a large number of different types of bombs, these were sub-divided into three main categories:
 Land bombs - for use against land targets. They were normally not produced to a high standard consisting of a simple cylindrical case, riveted or welded to a cast steel nose.
 Ordinary bombs - for use against ships. They were produced in general purpose and semi-armor-piercing types. They were of higher quality and generally had a smooth machined case
 Special bombs - for various purposes.

Color coding system

Bombs

Rocket bombs
The Japanese produced a number of bombs with rocket motors installed, intended for air-to-air use against bomber formations, or as armor-piercing weapons. Only two saw service, the Type 3 No.25 Mk 4 armor-piercing rocket bomb, and the Type 3 No.6 Mk.27 air-to-air rocket bomb.

Incendiary bombs
 Type 99 No.3 Mk 3
 Type 3 No.6 Mk 3 bomb model 1
 Type 2 No.25 Mk 3 bomb model 1
 Type 98 No.7 Mk 6 bomb model 1
 Type 98 No.7 Mk 6 bomb model 2
 Type 1 No.7 Mk 6 bomb model 3 mod 1
~ Type 45 No.44 Mk 6 bomb model 1

Gas bombs
No. 6 Mk 1
Type 1  No.6 Mk.1
Type 4 No.6 Mk 1

Cluster type bombs

 Type 2 No.6 Mk 21 bomb model 1
 Type 2 No.6 Mk 21 bomb model 2
 1 kg hollow-charge bomb
 1 kg anti-personnel bomb

Practice bombs
 1 kg Practice bomb Mod 2
 1 kg Practice bomb Mod 3
 No.3 Practice bomb Model 1
 Type 99 No.3 Practice bomb

Flares
 Type 96 landing flare
 Landing flare
 5 kg parachute flare Model 2 mod 1
 Type 0 parachute flare Model 1
 Type 0 parachute flare Model 1 mod 1
 Type 0 parachute flare Model 2
 Type 0 parachute flare Model 3 mod 1
 Experimental model 11 parachute flare
 Type 94 float light
 Experimental float light
 Type 94 model 2 float light
 Type 0 model 1 float light

Smoke floats and markers
 2 kg smoke float
 43 kg smoke float
 Type 0 Model 1 sea marker
 Type 0 Model 2 sea marker
 Cardboard type sea marker
 Type 3 No.6 target marker bomb
 Type 2 2 kg target indicator

Misc
 2 kg Window (Chaff) bomb

Fuzes
Japanese Navy bomb fuzes designation system was unknown to the Allies until after the end of the Second World War.  As a result, a designation system was created to describe the fuzes as follows. It consists of a capital letter, a numeral and a lower-case parenthetical letter.

The capital letter designates the fuzes type as follows:
 A - nose impact
 B - tail impact
 C - long delay fuze
 D - airburst fuze
 E - protective fuze

The numeral approximates the order in which the fuzes were captured by the allies. Finally the lower-case letter in parentheses indicates the different but similar designs.

Where possible the original Japanese designation is given.

 A-1(a)
 A-1(b)
 A-1(c)
 A-3(a) Type 97 Mk 2 nose fuze
 A-3(b) Type 1 nose fuze model 2
 A-3(c) Type 2 nose indicator
 A-3(d) Type 97 Mk 2 nose fuze Model 1
 A-3(e) Type 3 nose indicator
 A-3(f) Type 2 No.50 Ordinary bomb fuze model 1
 A-3(g)
 A-5(a)
 B-2(a) Type 99 No.25 Ordinary bomb fuze
 B-2(b) Type 99 No.80 Mk 5 Bomb fuze
 B-3(a) Type 15 tail fuze model 2
 B-3(b) Type 15 tail fuze model 1
 B-5(b)
 B-5(c)
 B-6(a) Type 97 rail initiator
 B-9(a) tail fuze
 B-10(a) tail fuze
 C-1(a) Type 99 special bomb fuze
 C-2(a) Type 99 special bomb nose fuze
 D-2(a)
 D-2(b)
 D-2(c)
 D-3(a)
 D-4(a) parachute flare fuze
 Type 3 electric firing device

See also
 List of Japanese World War II army bombs

References

Japan
World War II Navy Bombs
Navy bombs